Castellaneta Marina is a railway station in Castellaneta Marina, Italy. The station is located on the Taranto–Reggio di Calabria railway. The train services are operated by Trenitalia.

Train services
The station is served by the following service(s):

Regional services (Treno regionale) Naples - Salerno - Potenza - Metaponto - Taranto

References

Railway stations in Apulia
Buildings and structures in the Province of Taranto